The 1979–80 WHL season was the 14th season for the Western Hockey League.  Eleven teams completed a 72-game season.  The Regina Pats won the President's Cup.

League notes
The Edmonton Oil Kings relocated to Great Falls, Montana to become the Great Falls Americans, however the team only lasted 28 games, as the Americans ceased operations on December 16, 1979.
The WHL abandoned the three division format, opting instead for a two division format of eight teams in the East and four in the West.

Regular season

Final standings

1Folded mid-season

Scoring leaders
Note: GP = Games played; G = Goals; A = Assists; Pts = Points; PIM = Penalties in minutes

1980 WHL Playoffs

First round
Regina defeated Lethbridge 4 games to 0
Brandon defeated Calgary 4 games to 3
Medicine Hat defeated Billings 4 games to 3

Division semi-finals
Round Robin format

Medicine Hat (3–1) advanced
Regina (2–2) advanced
Brandon (1–3) eliminated
Victoria (5–3) advanced
Seattle (4–4) advanced
Portland (3–5) eliminated

Division finals
Regina defeated Medicine Hat 4 games to 1
Victoria defeated Seattle 4 games to 0

WHL Championship
Regina defeated Victoria 4 games to 1

All-Star game

There was no All-Star game in 1979–80.

WHL awards

All-Star Teams

See also
1980 Memorial Cup
1980 NHL Entry Draft
1979 in sports
1980 in sports

References
whl.ca
 2005–06 WHL Guide

Western Hockey League seasons
WCHL
WCHL